Thrissur is one of the 20 Lok Sabha (parliamentary) constituencies in the state of Kerala in southern India. It consists of seven assembly segments in Thrissur district.

Assembly segments

Thrissur Lok Sabha constituency is composed of the following assembly segments:

Thrissur
Ollur
Puthukkad
Manalur
Guruvayur
Nattika
Irinjalakuda

Members of Parliament

Thiru-Kochi

Election results

General election, 2019
According to Election Commission, there are 12,93,744 registered voters in Thrissur Constituency for 2019 Lok Sabha Election.

General election, 2014

See also
 2014 Indian general election in Kerala
 List of constituencies of the Lok Sabha
 Thrissur

References

External links
 Election Commission of India
Thrissur Lok Sabha Elections Asianet News survey results 2019

Lok Sabha constituencies in Kerala
Politics of Thrissur district